Frölunda Hockey Club, previously known as the Frölunda Indians, is a Swedish professional ice hockey club based in Gothenburg. They currently play in the highest Swedish league, the Swedish Hockey League (SHL), formerly the Elitserien, where they have played for most of the club's existence. They last played in the lower division, the Allsvenskan, in 1995. Frölunda have won the national championship title five times: in 1965, 2003, 2005, 2016 and 2019.

The club was founded on 3 February 1938, as an ice hockey section in Västra Frölunda IF and became independent on 29 March 1984. Prior to the 1995/1996 season, the nickname Indians was adopted. This referring to the successful years of the 1960s, when fans started to call them the "Wild West" (Västra Frölunda is West Frölunda in English). But as they did not want a nickname like cowboys or something with firearms, Indians was selected.
On 16 June 2004, the club shortened the name from Västra Frölunda Hockey Club to Frölunda Hockey Club. 
Frölunda's home venue is the Scandinavium arena in central Gothenburg, which has a capacity of 12,044 people. Frölundaborg is used when Scandinavium is occupied with other events.  Frölunda's average home attendance has been the highest in the league for over a decade.

History

In 2003 Frölunda became the champions after a 38-year hiatus. The final game in Scandinavium on 7 April against Färjestad BK was ended by late season recruit Tomi Kallio in the third overtime period.
In the 2004–05 season, the club's 60th anniversary and 20th as independent club, the team won the league title, by having the best record during the regular season, and the Swedish Championship. That particular year was notable because the National Hockey League had a labour stoppage due to negotiations between the league and the players association. Many professional hockey players who could not play in the NHL chose to play in European or North American leagues. The largest number of professional NHL players were in Sweden during the season, including Gothenburg native Daniel Alfredsson, who joined his hometown club for the season. This increased the quality of play and many observers said that Elitserien was the best league in the world during 2004–05.

Frölunda set a new Elitserien record on 6 April 2006, by winning the Elitserien playoff semi-finals against Linköpings HC 4–3 after trailing the series 1–3. The season ended with a 2–4 defeat against Färjestads BK in the finals. The second game in the finals Ronnie Sundin played his 685th game for Frölunda becoming the player with most career games for the club.

Frölunda has claimed the Champions Hockey League title on four separate occassions in 2015–16, 2016–17, 2018–19 and 2019–20, the most titles out of any club.

On 2 February 2022, Frölunda Hockey club presented their new logo. According to the club, the new logo represents the city of Gothenburg, Västra Frölunda, gentleness and excitedness. The logo visualizes two F's, two hands and the letter H which stands for hockey. The new logo received a lot of negative feedback from fans and media. The previous logo was announced in 1995 and represented the club for 27 years.

Season-by-season results

This is a partial list of the last five seasons completed by Frölunda. For the full season-by-season history, see Frölunda HC seasons.

Players and personnel

Current roster

Updated 20 February 2023

Team captains

 Rune Johansson, 1945–1960
 Lars-Eric Lundvall, 1960–1968
 Arne Carlsson, 1968–1969
 Lars-Erik Sjöberg, 1969–1974
 Henric Hedlund, 1974–1976
 Leif Henriksson, 1976–1977
 Lars-Erik Esbjörs, 1976–1979
 Anders Broström, 1979–1980
 Göran Nilsson, 1980–1983
 Thomas Kärrbrandt, 1983–1984
 Göran Nilsson, 1984–1985
 Hasse Sjöö, 1985–1987
 Janne Karlsson, 1987–1990
 Mikael Andersson, 1990–1992
 Terho Koskela, 1992–1995
 Christian Ruuttu, 1995–1996
 Henrik Nilsson, 1996–2000
 Mikael Andersson, 2000–2003
 Jonas Johnson, 2003–2008
 Niklas Andersson, 2008–2009
 Joel Lundqvist, 2009–present

Head coaches 

 Karl-Erik Eriksson, 1956–1960
 Lars-Eric Lundvall, 1960–1963
 Curly Leachman, 1963–1964
 Lars-Eric Lundvall, 1964–1969
 Arne Eriksson, 1969–1971
 Jack Bownass, 1971–1973
 Lars Erik Lundvall, 1973–1975
 Arne Strömberg, 1975–1978
 Leif Henriksson, 1978–1980
 Berny Karlsson, 1980–1981
 Len Lunde, 1981–1982
 Leif Henriksson, 1982–1983
 Kjell Jönsson, 1983–1984
 Roland Mattsson, 1984–1985
 Thommie Bergman, 1985–1987
 Conny Evensson, 1987–1989
 Lennart Åhlberg, 1989–1990
 Lars-Erik Esbjörs, 1990–1991
 Leif Boork, 1991–1994
 Ulf Labraaten, 1994–1995
 Lasse Falk, 1995–1997
 Tommy Boustedt, 1997–2001
 Conny Evensson, 2001–2004
 Janne Karlsson, 2004 (interim)
 Stephan Lundh, 2004–2006
 Per Bäckman, 2006–2007
 Roger Melin, 2007–2008
 Ulf Dahlén, 2008–2010
 Kent Johansson, 2010–2013
 Roger Rönnberg, 2013–present

Honored members

Frölunda Hockey have retired the numbers of four players, all on 3 March 2002. The number retired were; the number 13 worn by Lars Erik Lundvall, who spent eight seasons with Frölunda, all of them serving as team captain. The number 14 worn by Ronald "Sura Pelle" Pettersson, who spent seven seasons with Frölunda before suffering a career-ending injury on 14 December 1967. The duo of Lundvall and Pettersson was one of the reason behind Frölunda's success in the 60's and secured that hockey got a strong foothold in Gothenburg. The number 19 worn by Jörgen Pettersson during his two stints with Frölunda. Pettersson joined the club in 1970 and played ten seasons for the club before joining the St. Louis Blues of the NHL. After five seasons in the NHL he returned and played another three seasons for the club. The number 29 worn by Stefan Larsson during his sixteen seasons with Frölunda. With the exception of two seasons, Larsson played for Frölunda his entire professional career.

Two Frölunda players have been inducted into the International Ice Hockey Federation's Hall of Fame. Forward Ulf Sterner, played three seasons for Frölunda before becoming the first European-trained player to play in the NHL during his short sojourn with the New York Rangers during the 1964–65 NHL season; he was inducted in 2001. Forward Ronald "Sura Pelle" Pettersson, represented team Sweden in three olympic games and ten IIHF World Championships, totaling 252 games played for the national team; he was inducted in 2004. In 2003, former Frölunda players Christian Ruuttu and Jorma Salmi were inducted to the Finnish Hockey Hall of Fame.

Franchise records and leaders

Career 
 Most games played: Ronnie Sundin, 739 (1992–1997 and 1998–09)
 Most seasons played: Joel Lundqvist, 20* (2000-2006 and 2009-2022)
 Most points scored: Niklas Andersson, 540 (1987–1991 and 2001–2011)
 Most goals scored: Niklas Andersson, 201 (1987–1991 and 2001–2011)
 Most assists: Niklas Andersson, 339 (1987–1991 and 2001–2011)

Regular season 
 Most goals in a season: Magnus Kahnberg, 33 (2003–04)
 Most assists in a season: Niklas Andersson, 38 (2004–05)
 Most points in a season: Kristian Huselius, 67 (2000–01)
 Most penalty minutes in a season: Patric Blomdahl, 116 (2008–09)
 Most points in a season, defenceman: Magnus Johansson, 35 (2001–02)
 Most points in a season, rookie: Patrik Carnbäck, 54 (1989–90)
 Most shutouts in a season: Frederik Andersen, 8 (2011–12)
 Most power play goals in a season: Jonas Johnson, 12 (2005–06)
 Most short handed goals in a season: Kristian Huselius, 5 (2000–01)

Playoffs 
 Most goals in a playoff season: Daniel Alfredsson, 12 (2004–05)
 Most goals by a defenseman in a playoff season: Ronnie Sundin, 6 (2005–06)
 Most assists in a playoff season: Jonas Johnson, 11 (2005–06)
 Most points in a playoff season: Artturi Lehkonen, 19 (2015–2016)
 Most points by a defenceman in a playoff season: Ronnie Sundin; Christian Bäckman, 9 (2002–03, 2005–06; 2004–05)
 Most shutouts in a playoff season: Henrik Lundqvist, 6 (2004–05)
 Most penalty minutes in a playoff season: Joel Lundqvist, 57 (2000–01)

Team 
 Most points in a season: 112 (2004–05)
 Most wins in a season: 33 (2004–05)
 Most goals in a season: 181 (2001–02)
 Fewest goals against in a season: 96 (2004–05)

Scoring leaders
These are the top-ten point-scorers of Frölunda HC since the 1975–76 season. Figures are updated after each completed regular season.

Note: Pos = Position; GP = Games played; G = Goals; A = Assists; Pts = Points; P/G = Points per game;  = current Frölunda HC player

References

External links

 
 Meltzer, Bill. NHL.com article on Frölunda players in NHL Draft. Retrieved 2007-06-13.

 
Swedish Hockey League teams
Ice hockey teams in Sweden
Sports clubs in Gothenburg
1938 establishments in Sweden
Ice hockey clubs established in 1938
Ice hockey teams in Västra Götaland County